Annelien Coorevits (born 1986) is a Belgian TV-presenter and model (Miss Belgium 2007). She represented her country in Miss Universe 2007 but didn't place. She lives in Wijtschate.

Annelien Coorevits is married to Anderlecht-soccer player Olivier Deschacht. She is political active for the liberal party Open VLD and is a TV-presenter for VIJF.

References 

Living people
1986 births
Belgian female models
Miss Universe 2007 contestants
Flemish people
Belgian beauty pageant winners
Miss Belgium winners